Henri Delavallée (1862, Reims – 1943, Pont-Aven) was a French Post-Impressionist painter who became a member of the artists colony in Pont-Aven.

Biography

A fantastic student at school, in 1879 Delavallée enrolled simultaneously at the Sorbonne and at the École des Beaux-Arts where he studied under the finest art teachers of the period: Carolus-Duran, Luc-Olivier Merson, Henri Lehmann and Ernest Hébert. He also met Gabrielle Moreau, his future wife, while he was there. In the early 1880s, one of his artist friends, Hersart du Buron, encouraged him to go to Brittany with him to find landscapes they could paint. They visited the island of Ushant, Le Faouët and Châteauneuf-du-Faou before reaching  Pont-Aven, where they stayed with his friend's cousins. In 1886, during one of his many stays in the village, he met Paul Gauguin and Émile Bernard.

In 1887, thanks to his friend Félix Bracquemond, he was introduced to Camille Pissarro and Georges Seurat. He worked with Pissarro, whose approach he particularly appreciated, in Marlotte, producing works in the Divisionist and Pointillist styles. In 1889, he also made etchings. From 1891 to 1896, he exhibited at Paul Durand-Ruel's gallery, at the Société des Amis des Arts in Nantes, and at the Paris Salons. In 1894, he met Paul Gauguin in Pont-Aven. In May 1895, he exhibited three works at Liège. In 1896, the family left Paris for Constantinople where he and his wife mixed with Turkish high society. In 1901, they returned to France and established their home in Pont-Aven where they associated with Théodore Botrel. In 1941, the Galerie Saluden in Quimper put on a retrospective of his work. He died in 1943 in Pont-Aven where he is buried.

Gallery

References

Bibliography 
Henri Delavallée, Daniel Morane, Musée de Pont-Aven: Henri Delavallée, 1862-1943: catalogue de l'oeuvre gravé, Musée de Pont-Aven, 1996, 64 pp.

Post-impressionist painters
19th-century French painters
20th-century French painters
20th-century French male artists
French male painters
1862 births
1943 deaths
Artists from Reims
Pont-Aven painters
University of Paris alumni
19th-century French male artists